Saint Peter's Cathedral, Belfast, is the Catholic cathedral church for the Diocese of Down and Connor, and is therefore the episcopal seat of the Catholic Bishop of Down and Connor. It is located in the Divis Street area of the Falls Road in Belfast, Northern Ireland, and construction began in the 1860s. There are two choirs: the Cathedral Choir sings at the Vigil Mass and the Down & Connor Schola Cantorum (Boys’ Choir) sings at the 11am Mass.

History

Until the Reformation the cathedral of the Diocese of Down and Connor had been at Downpatrick. However, at the beginning of the 19th century, Belfast was a growing town; and with the appointment of William Crolly in 1825, the episcopal seat moved there. St Peter's was originally envisaged as the parish church for the expanding post-Famine Catholic population of Belfast. The site was provided by a wealthy Belfast flour merchant and philanthropist, Bernard Hughes  while the church was designed by Fr Jeremiah Ryan McAuley, who had trained as an architect before he became a priest.

The church was opened on 14 October 1866. The signature twin spires were added in 1886.

It was built on a scale and with a level of high quality interior decoration that it became known as a pro-cathedral, or temporary cathedral, for the diocese. In that regard it was an honour shared with St Patrick's Church, Belfast, in Donegall St where, for example, Bishop Patrick Dorrian was buried in 1885 and where in 1929 Bishop Daniel Mageean was consecrated bishop.

The decision to designate St Peter's as the diocesan cathedral was taken by Bishop Cahal Daly who celebrated the Mass on 29 June 1986 at which the building was formally designated as the cathedral church of Down and Connor.

Design

The exterior is of Scrabo sandstone with Scottish sandstone dressings. Internally there is a hammer-beam ceiling. There were several extensive refurbishments in 1950, in 1986 under the direction of the Irish artist Ray Carroll and again in 2003–2005 while Patrick Walsh (bishop of Down and Connor) was bishop which undid much of the 1980s work.  One respected critic said of this most recent renovation "This most recent work has restored the Cathedral much nearer to its original appearance, especially in the use of strong and vibrant colours, on the fine hammer-beam ceiling."

It is a Grade A listed building.

Liturgy in the cathedral

Mass is celebrated every day in the cathedral:  
 Sunday Masses are: Vigil (Saturday) 5.30pm; 9am and 11am (High Mass).
 Weekday Masses are at 10am, Monday, Wednesday, Friday and Saturday; 7.30pm on Tuesdays and Thursdays.

Other sacraments and liturgies:
 Confessions are at 10.30am and 5pm on Saturdays.
 Adoration of the Most Blessed Sacrament takes place each Tuesday and Thursday from 10am - 7pm.
 Baptisms take place on Saturdays at 1pm. 
 As the diocesan Cathedral, St Peter's hosts major celebrations in the local Church calendar such as the Chrism Mass on Holy Thursday.

Past administrators
From St Peter's Cathedral website unless otherwise stated:
Fr William Blaney VG: 1866–1873
Fr Andrew McAuley: 1873–1882
Fr Patrick Convery: 1882–1895
Fr John McCartan: 1895–1898
Fr John Tohill: 1898–1905
Fr Bernard Laverty: 1905–1911
Fr John Healy: 1911–1919
Fr Thomas McDonald: 1919–1928
Fr William Patrick Lagan: March 1928
Fr Alexander McAteer: 1929–1930
Fr George McKillop: 1930–1938 - died in office as Adm.
Fr John McLaverty: 1938–1943
Fr George Watson: 1943–1945
Fr Leo McKeown: 1945–1949
Fr Laurence Higgins: 1949–1955
Fr Patrick McAtamney: 1955–1960
Fr Joseph McConville: 1960–1963
Fr James McCloskey: 1963–1966
Fr Sean O’Neill: 1966–1967
Canon Padraig Murphy: 1967–1971
Fr Francis Teggart: 1971–1974
Fr Alexander Darragh: 1974–1978
Fr Vincent McKinley: 1978–1983
Fr Joseph McGurnaghan: 1983–1986
Fr Sean Connolly: 1986–1990
Fr Anthony Alexander: 1990–1994
Monsignor Thomas Toner: 1994–2006 
Fr Hugh Kennedy: 2006–2016
Fr Martin Graham: 2016 –

Bibliography
 Peter Galloway, The Cathedrals of Ireland, The Institute of Irish Studies, The Queen's University of Belfast, (1992).

References

External links
 A picture of the cathedral.
 Official Site

Roman Catholic cathedrals in Northern Ireland
Churches in Belfast
Saint Peter
Roman Catholic Diocese of Down and Connor
Grade A listed buildings
Gothic Revival church buildings in Northern Ireland
Roman Catholic churches completed in 1866
19th-century Roman Catholic church buildings in the United Kingdom
19th-century churches in Northern Ireland